Margarida Rosa Cassola Ribeiro (15 November 1911 - 6 May 2001) was a Portuguese anthropologist who did studies of the Portuguese Colonial Wars. She also worked in museums beginning in the 1940s.

References

External links 
Coruche Museum - Documents Center of Margarida Rosa Cassola Ribeiro

Portuguese archaeologists
Portuguese women archaeologists
Portuguese ethnographers
Portuguese women scientists
1911 births
2001 deaths
Portuguese anthropologists
Portuguese women anthropologists
20th-century archaeologists
20th-century anthropologists